The 1985–86 Segunda División season saw 20 teams participate in the second flight Spanish league. Real Murcia, CE Sabadell FC and RCD Mallorca were promoted to Primera División. Albacete Bp., Deportivo Aragón, CD Tenerife and Atlético Madrileño were relegated to Segunda División B.

Teams

Final table

Results

Segunda División seasons
2
Spain